Pterospermum suberifolium, or the cork-leaved bayur, is a species of evergreen flowering plant in the family Malvaceae. It is found only in India and Sri Lanka. Leaves are irregularly oblong; subcordate, rounded or oblique; apex acuminate; with irregularly serrated margin. Its flowers are yellowish white and fruit is a capsule.

A famous nagaraja in Buddhism is named for the fruit of the P. suberifolium, mucalinda.

Medicinal value
The plant is used for cure fractured bones in Ayurvedic medicine, where they are grind into a paste with some other medicinal herbs.

References

Pharmacognostic Studies of Leaves of Pterospermum Suberifolium
Structural and immunochemical studies on Pterospermum suberifolium gum

suberifolium
Flora of the Indian subcontinent